Cormac Mac Duinnshléibhe (anglicized as Cormac MacDonlevy) was an Irish physician and scribe, fl. c. 1460. He was an influential medieval Irish physician and medical scholar of the Arabian school educated at universities on the Continent. He is famed for advancing Irish medieval medical practice by, for the first time, translating seminal Continental European medical texts from Latin to vernacular. His translations provided the, then, exclusively, Irish speaking and normally hereditarily apprenticed majority of Irish physicians with their first reference access to these texts.

Background
Cormac was descended from the Donlevy, who were the last ruling dynasty of the over-kingdom of Ulaid. They migrated to the kingdom of Tyrconnell and became hereditary chief physicians to its rulers. 

He held a bachelor of physic, although the medical school or university from which he graduated is unknown.

Works
Mac Duinnshléibhe was notable for being a prolific translator, creating and consolidating Irish medical, anatomical, pharmaceutical, and botanical terms.

In 1459, in Cloyne, Co. Cork, he translated De Dosibus Medicarum by Walter de Agilon.

In or about 1470, Cormac MacDonlevy, M.B. commenced the 12-year task of first translating the French physician Bernard of Gordon's extensive medical work, the Lilium medicine (1320), from Latin to Irish. Thereafter, as it had some 150 years earlier with the Continental European medical community, the monumental Lilium medicine or English "Lily of Medicine" achieved great popularity among the medical community of the Celtic nations. Excerpts were included in the Catalogue of the Irish Manuscripts in the British Museum by Standish Hayes O'Grady and Robin Flower.

Cormac, also, first translated Gordon's De pronosticis (c. 1295) and Gaulteris Agilon's De dosibus (c. 1250) from Latin into Irish. Gaulteris' De dosibus is a pharmaceutical tract and well used historical source, providing a concise introduction to the basic principles and operations of medieval European pharmacy. Cormac, too, first translated from Latin to Irish the French surgeon Guy de Chauliac's Chirurgia magna, a major surgical text by that French physician and surgeon (c. 1363) and, also, 5 other major Continental European medical texts in addition to those hereto cited.

Mac Duinnshléibhe also translated Gordon's De decem ingeniis curandorum morborum (1299).

References

15th-century Irish writers
Irish scribes
15th-century Irish people
15th-century Irish medical doctors
Irish Latinists